van Hemert/van Heemert is a Dutch surname. Notable people with the surname include:

Hans van Hemert (born 1945), Dutch music producer
Mirjam van Hemert (born 1950), Dutch swimmer
Roel van Hemert (born 1984), Dutch footballer
Willy van Hemert (1912–1993), Dutch director
Cees van Heemert (born 1946) IT VP/Director Europe/Asia/USA
Albert van Heemert (1953-1996) Business/Sales expert 
Alexa (Lexi) van Heemert (born 1994) Real Estate Specialist
Hans van Heemert (born 1992) Automotive Service Specialist
Kristel van Heemert (born 1978; Utrecht (Netherlands) Communications Specialist
Taran van Hemert, editor at Linus Media Group

Dutch-language surnames
Surnames of Dutch origin